Aniara is a 2018 science fiction film written and directed by Pella Kågerman and Hugo Lilja. The film is an adaptation of the 1956 Swedish epic poem of the same name by Harry Martinson. The film is set in a dystopian future where climate change ravages Earth, prompting mass migration from Earth to Mars. When one such routine trip veers off course, the passengers of the Aniara struggle to cope with their new lives.

The film premiered at the 2018 Toronto International Film Festival and was given a theatrical release in 2019 by Magnolia Pictures.

Plot
Sometime in the future, Earth has been ravaged by natural disasters and sea-levels rise, making it largely uninhabitable. A woman (Emelie Garbers) works on board the Aniara, a luxurious spaceship that takes passengers from Earth to Mars in three weeks. Her job involves working as a "Mimarobe" within the Mima, an artificial intelligence designed to evoke viewers' experiences of Earth's lush, verdant past through a totally immersive virtual-reality experience that taps into participants' memories and emotions.

In the first week of Aniara's voyage, the ship suddenly veers off course to avoid a collision with space debris. Some of the debris pierces the hull and hits the ship's nuclear reactor, setting off an imminent meltdown and forcing the crew to eject all the ship's fuel. This results in the ship having no navigational control, no propulsion, and thus no ability to resume its original course. Captain Chefone promises the passengers and crew that they will be able to resume the trip to Mars once the ship passes a celestial body, which should happen in no more than two years. The Mimarobe's roommate, the ship's astronomer, later reveals to her that this is a lie and that there is no possibility of resuming their course.

On board, the Mimarobe finds her usually unimportant job becoming more popular and necessary than ever, as passengers crave the Mima to soothe them from claustrophobia and panic attacks. After three years the Mima becomes one of the most important functions necessary to keep calm on board the ship. With so many people bringing their horrific memories of Earth's destruction to the Mima, it becomes overwhelmed and self-destructs, committing suicide. Though the Mimarobe had asked the captain for a month of rest for the Mima, she is blamed for the machine's malfunction and imprisoned.

By the fourth year, cults have developed, and suicides lead the Mimarobe and Isagel, a former pilot, who is now the Mimarobe's lover, to be granted releases and reassigned to work. The Mimarobe and Isagel join a fertility cult dedicated to Mima, which leaves Isagel pregnant after an orgy. She suffers from depression during her pregnancy and is tempted to end the child's life after it is born. The Mimarobe wants to build a "beam-screen", a projection device acting as a mimic of Mima to alleviate Isagel's depression, while Captain Chefone forbids her from doing so and orders her to focus on educating children in the hopes that one or more of them might be able to discover a way to return them to Mars.

In the fifth year, the ship's astronomer and Isagel discover that a probe large enough to possibly contain fuel is travelling towards the Aniara, meaning that a rescue is possibly being attempted. The probe takes over a year to reach the Aniara, and upon being brought onto the ship in the sixth year, the crew quickly realize that they are unable to identify it, its origins or whether it contains fuel. While the captain orders the crew to keep working on the probe, they eventually lose hope of it being a means of rescue. The Astronomer laments that their ship is a sarcophagus, defying Captain Chefone's orders for the crew to keep a united front to prevent the passengers from losing hope. In a fit of rage, Captain Chefone shoots a taser at the Astronomer, which kills her.

The Mimarobe begins work on her projection device, eventually succeeding in projecting a waterfall onto the dark windows of the spaceship. Having succeeded, she learns that Isagel has committed suicide and has also killed the child they were raising together. Five years later, the few remaining crew celebrate the 10th anniversary of their voyage into space. While listlessly accepting an honorary medal from Captain Chefone for her creation of the beam-screen, the Mimarobe notices that his wrists are bandaged from a presumed suicide attempt. The algae tanks the passengers rely on for food and water have become contaminated. In year 24 of the voyage, a few remaining survivors, including the Mimarobe, sit cross-legged in a dimly lit room. An unidentified woman in the group rhapsodizes about the divine power of sunlight on Earth, as the ship slowly descends into final darkness.

Finally, in year  of its voyage, the Aniara – derelict, frozen and devoid of human life – reaches the Lyra constellation and approaches a planet as verdant and welcoming as Earth was formerly.

Cast
 Emelie Garbers as the Mimarobe
  as Isagel
 Arvin Kananian as Captain Chefone
 Anneli Martini as the Astronomer

Reception
Aniara received generally favorable reviews. The website's critics consensus reads: "Dazzling, but a little dull, ANIARAs impeccable production design is undermined by its underwhelming philosophical pondering." On Metacritic it holds a score of 61% based on 16 critics.

Norman Wilner at NOW Toronto says that the film "embraces the existential possibilities of sci-fi cinema". The Guardian, in two reviews, gave the film four stars, calling it a "stunning sci-fi eco parable" and an "eerily mesmerising outer-space odyssey" respectively. Flickering Myth characterizes Jonsson's Mimarobe as "complex and sensitive". Teo Bugbee at The New York Times characterized Aniara as "depressing", but also said that "the commitment to bleakness feels artistically admirable". Hollywood Reporter, on the other hand, said: "But while the themes are clear, drama is perilously missing."

Aniara won the "Asteroid" Prize for Best International Film at the 2019 Trieste Science+Fiction Festival.

The film took home four awards at the 2020 Swedish Guldbagge awards ceremony, including Best Actress in a leading role and Best Supporting Actress to Emelie Garbers (née Jonsson) and Bianca Cruzeiro respectively.

References

External links
 
 

2018 films
2018 LGBT-related films
2010s science fiction adventure films
Augmented reality in fiction
Danish LGBT-related films
Danish science fiction adventure films
Existentialist films
Filicide in fiction
Films about cults
Films about death
Films based on poems
Films set in the future
Films set on spacecraft
Lesbian-related films
LGBT-related science fiction films
Murder–suicide in films
Post-apocalyptic films
Space adventure films
Swedish LGBT-related films
Swedish science fiction adventure films
2010s Swedish-language films
2018 science fiction films
Social science fiction films
2010s Swedish films
Climate change films